The Alexandria "Blue Boy"  is a very rare stamp. It takes its name from the feature that makes it unique: its color. One of the few surviving stamps from a rare issue—the Postmaster's Provisionals produced in Alexandria, D.C., beginning in 1846, only seven of which are known—the Blue Boy is the sole example printed on blue paper (the others are on buff-colored paper). Postally used, the Blue Boy remains affixed to its original envelope, which last sold in 2019 and still holds the record for the highest priced cover of United States philately.

Background
Alexandria was one of eleven municipalities that produced stamps to afford customers a convenient means of prepaying mail at a time before the United States introduced national postage stamps on July 1, 1847.  Although the use of provisional stamps was officially prohibited after the introduction of a national stamp system, it continued sporadically, including in the case of the Blue Boy. During the Alexandria provisionals' period of use, the city was in the process of being retroceded from the District of Columbia to the state of Virginia, a process finalized on March 13, 1847.

Production

The Alexandria provisionals were produced under the auspices of the city's postmaster, Daniel Bryan. While just who supplied the stamps is undocumented, experts think it likely that they were fashioned with the equipment of a newspaper down the street from the post office, the Alexandria Gazette, published by Edgar Snowden. The provisionals were printed in pairs from a typeset form that produced two not-quite-identical images, classified by philatelic experts as Type I and Type II.  The Blue Boy is one of the four surviving Type I stamps; only three Type II examples are known. Both types conform to same general circular design, which presents an outer rim of rosettes surrounding a smaller ring of text:  "ALEXANDRIA "* POST OFFICE. *"; and, at the stamp’s center, the horizontal word "PAID" with the numeral "5" below it.  However, while Type I has forty rosettes, only thirty-nine appear on Type II—which, moreover, differs from Type I in its spacing of letters and asterisks. The provisionals' two-at-a-time production indicates that at least one Type II Blue Boy must have once existed.

The cover

The single surviving Blue Boy today remains attached to the yellowish envelope on which it was originally mailed, cancelled with a "PAID" handstamp. In 1981, a German collector acquired it through the dealer David Feldman for one million dollars.

In the 2013 Scott catalogue listing of the Blue Boy, a dash appears in the value column instead of a number: an indication that "information is lacking or insufficient for establishing a usable catalogue value."

Its last recorded sale took place in 2019 when it fetched $1.18 million.

Value and statistical singularity are not the only factors that have made the Blue Boy the subject of stamp lore.  A romantic story also attaches to it, which was eventually recounted in an article in The Washington Post. The Blue Boy paid postage for a letter written by James Wallace Hoof on November 24, 1847, and sent in secret to his second cousin Janette H. Brown, whom he was courting against the wishes of her family.  The stamp only narrowly escaped destruction, for at the bottom of his letter James wrote "Burn as usual."  He and Janette had to wait almost six years before they could marry, at last tying the knot on February 17, 1853.

At some time, Janette put the letter into a sewing box, and it was not found there until 1907, when her daughter, also named Janette, came across it. Later that year, a collector acquired the envelope for $3,000 (only three other examples of Alexandria provisionals were then known).  The letter remained among the family papers.

Given that the Blue Boy was a provisional and local—rather than regular and national—issue, there is room for disagreement over whether it fully merits placement in the elite category of one-of-a-kind stamps alongside the Treskilling Yellow of Sweden and the British Guiana one cent magenta.

See also
List of notable postage stamps
US provisional issue stamps
A Gallery of U. S. Postmasters' Provisional Stamps, 1845-47

Notes

References

External links 
 The "Primitives": USA Postmaster Provisionals David Feldman

Provisional stamps of the United States
Postal history of the United States
1847 works
History of Alexandria, Virginia
Postage stamps
Unique postage stamps